Gary Axelbank is a New York City journalist, disk jockey and TV personality based in The Bronx. He has been called the "Edward R. Murrow" and "Charlie Rose" of the Bronx.

Axelbank is the host of BronxTalk and The Bronx Buzz on BronxNet, a public, educational and government access cable TV network available on Cablevision and Verizon FIOS. BronxTalk is a weekly show that features politicians, business leaders, and community stakeholders in a half-hour interview on the issues facing the Bronx. Axelbank hosted over 1,000 episodes through the show's 25-year history. During election cycles, the show is often home to debates between Bronx politicians. In 2018, Axelbank estimated he's hosted 60 political debates.

Axelbank was born in the Bronx, graduated from DeWitt Clinton High School and Lehman College, and worked as a radio DJ alongside Howard Stern. He also worked as the director of community relations for Monroe College. He launched a local news website called thisisthebronx.info in 2017.

He frequently appears on City & State's annual Bronx Power lists of the most influential people in the borough.

References

External links 
 
 

Living people
American television hosts
People from the Bronx
DeWitt Clinton High School alumni
Lehman College alumni
Television personalities from New York City
20th-century American journalists
American male journalists
Journalists from New York (state)
21st-century American journalists
Year of birth missing (living people)